Nicosia Lawson is a beauty queen who represented the Cayman Islands in both Miss World 2008 and Miss Universe 2009. She previously placed 2nd runner-up in the 2000 Miss Teen Cayman Islands competition.

Early life
Nicosia was born in St. Vincent & the Grenadines on 4 April 1983 but grew up in the Cayman Islands.

She has represented the Cayman Islands as an athlete in netball and track and field as well as a youth ambassador (CARICOM Youth Ambassador (2006 to 2008)and at the 6th Commonwealth Youth Forum in Uganda in 2007).

Modelling
Nicosia was signed with B&M Models in Toronto and Models International Management in Ottawa. She was featured in a fashion spread in Glow magazine in 2004.

In 2006 Nicosia started her own local women's magazine called Inspire.

Charity work and social groups
Nicosia has continually expressed her passion for the fight against HIV/AIDS and has supported organizations that advocate education and prevention, research and legislation, capacity building and advocacy. She supports the Cayman Aids Foundation (CAF) and was trained as a National Trainer for the Cayman Islands' Red Cross 'Together We Can' Peer-to-Peer program. She is currently working on a short documentary to education young people in the Cayman Islands about HIV/AIDS and has already launched Public Service Announcements encouraging young people to know their status.

She is also a member of the Rotaract Blue Club of the Cayman Islands and was the Director of International Service for 2007 to 2008.

Miss World 2008
At the 2008 Miss World competition Nicosia was one of the top 16 finalists in the fast track talent event where she sang India.Arie's 'Ready for Love'.

Sources
 Miss Cayman Islands 2007 / 2008
 News article
 Article

External links 

1983 births
Living people
Miss World 2008 delegates
Miss Universe 2009 contestants
Caymanian beauty pageant winners
Caymanian models
Caymanian people of African descent
Saint Vincent and the Grenadines emigrants to the Cayman Islands